Eldosol Solar Power Station is a  solar power plant, under construction in Kenya, the largest economy in the East African Community.

Location
This site lies adjacent to Radiant Solar Power Station.

Overview
The power station has a capacity of 40 megawatts, to be sold directly to the Kenya Power and Lighting Company for integration in the national electricity grid. The electricity is evacuated via a substation near the power station, connected to a high voltage transmission line that passes near the power station. The power station comprises 140,800 photovoltaic modules and a medium voltage step-up transformer (400 V – 22 kV). The anticipated annual electricity generation is 74,968,000 MWh.

Developers
The power station is under devewas developed by a consortium comprising the entities listed in the table below. The developers also own the power station, as well as the adjacent 40 megawatt Radiant Solar Power Plant.

Construction timeline, costs and funding
The cost of construction was budgeted at US$78 million (approx.€70 million). In 2018, the European Investment Bank approved a loan of €30 million (US$37.5 million) towards the construction of this power station. The developer/owners will raise the difference of €40 million (approximately US$45 million). An equal loan amount was also approved for Radiant Solar Power Station, by the same lender, on similar terms. The power station is expected to be commissioned before the end of 2019.

See also

List of power stations in Kenya

References

External links
 Environmental and Social Impact Assessment Project Report: Eldosol Energy Power Station As of October 2015.

Solar power stations in Kenya
Eldoret
Uasin Gishu County
Proposed solar power stations in Kenya